Pic de Bugatet (2,877 m) is a mountain in the Néouvielle massif in the Pyrenees, lying within the Néouvielle National Nature Reserve in the commune of Saint-Lary-Soulan within the department of the Hautes-Pyrénées.

Mountains of Hautes-Pyrénées
Mountains of the Pyrenees
Two-thousanders of France